Deputy Inspector General of Prisons, shortened to DIG of Prisons or DIG Prisons, is a high-ranking official in the provincial prison service, usually the controlling officer or head of a region or circle of district, central, special and women jails/prisons, borstal institutions and remand homes within a province in Bangladesh, India, Pakistan and Sri Lanka.

See also
IG Prisons
AIG Prisons
Senior Superintendent of Jail
Superintendent of Jail

Prison officers ranks in India
Prison officers ranks in Pakistan
Prison officers ranks in Bangladesh